The 1988–89 AHL season was the 53rd season of the American Hockey League. Fourteen teams played 80 games each in the schedule. The league abandoned awarding points for an overtime loss. The Sherbrooke Canadiens finished first overall in the regular season. The Adirondack Red Wings won their third Calder Cup championship.

Team changes
 The Nova Scotia Oilers move to Sydney, Nova Scotia, becoming the Cape Breton Oilers.
 The Fredericton Express move to Halifax, Nova Scotia, becoming the Halifax Citadels.

Final standings
Note: GP = Games played; W = Wins; L = Losses; T = Ties; GF = Goals for; GA = Goals against; Pts = Points;

Scoring leaders

Note: GP = Games played; G = Goals; A = Assists; Pts = Points; PIM = Penalty minutes

 complete list

Calder Cup playoffs

Trophy and award winners
Team awards

Individual awards

Other awards

See also
List of AHL seasons

References
AHL official site
AHL Hall of Fame
HockeyDB

 
American Hockey League seasons
2
2